Lova Elly Linnea Lundin (born 25 October 1998) is a Swedish footballer who plays as a forward for Swedish Damallsvenskan club Djurgården.

Club career
A product of Torsångs IF, Lundin has played at senior level for Kvarnsvedens IK and Umeå IK in Sweden.

References

1998 births
Living people
People from Borlänge Municipality
Swedish women's footballers
Women's association football forwards
Kvarnsvedens IK players
Umeå IK players
EdF Logroño players
Damallsvenskan players
Swedish expatriate women's footballers
Swedish expatriate sportspeople in Spain
Expatriate women's footballers in Spain
Sportspeople from Dalarna County